Vera Jordanova (born 28 August 1975) is a Bulgarian-Finnish model, actress and cookbook author.

Early life
Vera Jordanova was born on 28 August 1975 in Helsinki, Finland, to Bulgarian musicians. Due to Jordanova's parents' profession, Vera spent the early part of her youth traveling with them in Scandinavia. At the age of 7 Vera was relocated to live with her grandmother in Bulgaria where she started school. In her teens, Jordanova's parents relocated the family to Finland where she graduated from high-school specializing in language studies.  She is fluent in Bulgarian, Finnish and English and speaks some Russian and has basic knowledge of Spanish and French.

Career
Modeling

Shortly after she moved to Finland, she was discovered by the premiere Finnish modeling agency Paparazzi.
Soon Vera was seen on national magazine covers, advertising campaigns, TV commercials and became a familiar face in the Finnish media. 
Modeling opened the doors to traveling abroad and with that to work for internationally known designers and brands. Vera spent the next ten years living and working in Milan, Paris, Hamburg, Cape Town, Barcelona, Miami, Los Angeles and New York. </ref> and the Czech Republic's June 2007 edition of Esquire.
Vera has modeled for designers and brands such as Karl Lagerfeld, Thierry Mugler, Isabel Marant, Jean Charles de Castelbajac, Claude Montana, Armand Basi,Clarins, Marimekko, Felina Lingerie, Bacardi, Budweiser, Schweppes, Speedo, Lexus, Saks 5th Ave and Stilla to name a few. 
Jordanova was featured in the 2006 Maxim calendar and has appeared in FHM and the Czech Republic's June 2007 edition of Esquire.

Acting

Jordanova started her acting career in Finland, where she appeared in a few Finnish TV series, such as Isänmaan Toivot. Her debut in American cinema was in Eli Roth's horror sequel Hostel II, playing the part of Axelle, a mysterious woman who works for Elite Hunting to lure tourists into the Slovakian "death factory" for worldwide clientele of torture aficionados.
In 2021 Vera landed the main role in the Bulgarian TV drama series Belezi where she portrays the provocative and manipulative Vera Dermendjieva. 

Cookbook

In 2014 Vera published a memoir cookbook Don't Miss a Bite: Stories and Flavors from around the World (WSOY). The book, which was first published in Finland, explores food, culture and identity in the form of 100 recipes, short biographical stories and Vera's own drawings and photography.

Publications

Filmography

Television

Music videos

References

External links
Instagram

Official Site

1975 births
Living people
Finnish people of Bulgarian descent
Writers from Helsinki
Finnish film actresses
Finnish female models
Finnish television actresses
Finnish expatriates in the United States
Actresses from Helsinki
Cookbook writers